Strandquist is a city in Lincoln Township of Marshall County, Minnesota, United States. The population was 70 at the 2020 census.

History
A post office called Strandquist has been in operation since 1899. The city was named for J. E. Strandquist, a pioneer merchant.

Geography

Demographics

2010 census
As of the census of 2010, there were 69 people, 32 households, and 16 families living in the city. The racial makeup of the city was 95.7% White, 1.4% Native American, and 2.9% from other races. Hispanic or Latino of any race were 4.3% of the population.

There were 32 households, of which 31.3% had children under the age of 18 living with them, 34.4% were married couples living together, 9.4% had a female householder with no husband present, 6.3% had a male householder with no wife present, and 50.0% were non-families. 43.8% of all households were made up of individuals, and 12.5% had someone living alone who was 65 years of age or older. The average household size was 2.16 and the average family size was 3.06.

The median age in the city was 45.2 years. 24.6% of residents were under the age of 18; 5.6% were between the ages of 18 and 24; 18.7% were from 25 to 44; 37.6% were from 45 to 64; and 13% were 65 years of age or older. The gender makeup of the city was 56.5% male and 43.5% female.

2000 census
As of the census of 2000, there were 88 people, 39 households, and 23 families living in the city. The racial makeup of the city was 96.59% White, 1.14% Native American, 2.27% from other races. Hispanic or Latino of any race were 2.27% of the population.

There were 39 households, out of which 28.2% had children under the age of 18 living with them, 51.3% were married couples living together, 7.7% had a female householder with no husband present, and 38.5% were non-families. 33.3% of all households were made up of individuals, and 7.7% had someone living alone who was 65 years of age or older. The average household size was 2.26 and the average family size was 2.88.

In the city, the population was spread out, with 23.9% under the age of 18, 3.4% from 18 to 24, 33.0% from 25 to 44, 22.7% from 45 to 64, and 17.0% who were 65 years of age or older. The median age was 38 years. For every 100 females, there were 109.5 males. For every 100 females age 18 and over, there were 103.0 males.

The median income for a household in the city was $19,688, and the median income for a family was $24,375. Males had a median income of $27,500 versus $18,750 for females. The per capita income for the city was $12,962. There were 8.7% of families and 10.8% of the population living below the poverty line, including no under eighteens and 10.5% of those over 64.

References

Cities in Marshall County, Minnesota
Cities in Minnesota